Zdeněk is a Czech given name derived from the Latin name Sidonius.  contested the relation with  the Latin name, and an alternative etymology is a diminutive of Zdeslav.

The South Slavic counterpart is Zdenko. The feminine counterpart is Zdenka.

In Slovenian, it means stopgap.

Notable people with the name include:

Zdeněk Altner (born 1947), Doctor of Laws, is a Czech lawyer and advocate
Zdeněk Adamec (born 1956), retired javelin thrower who represented Czechoslovakia
Zdeněk Bárta (1891–1987), Bohemian Olympic fencer
Jan Zdeněk Bartoš (1908–1981), Czech composer
Zdeněk Bažant (born 1937), Professor at Northwestern University's Robert R. McCormick School of Engineering and Applied Science
Zdeněk Blatný (born 1981), Czech professional ice hockey left wing
Zdeněk Bohutínský (born 1946), Czechoslovak sprint canoeist
Zdeněk Bradáč (born 1981), Czech illusionist, magician, escapologist, juggler and record-breaker
Zdeněk Burian (1905–1981), Czech painter, paleoartist and book illustrator
Zdeněk Černický (born 1914), Czechoslovak canoeist
Zdeněk Doležal (born 1931), pair skater who competed for Czechoslovakia
Zdeněk Fibich (1850–1900), Czech composer of classical music
Zdeněk Fierlinger (1891–1976), Czech politician
Zdeněk Fifka, Czechoslovak slalom canoeist who competed in the mid-1960s
Zdeněk Folprecht (composer), Czech conductor
Zdeněk Folprecht (footballer) (born 1991), professional Czech football player
Zdeněk Frolík (1933–1989), Czech mathematician
Zdeněk Groessl (born 1941), Czech former volleyball player
Zdeněk Grygera (born 1980), Czech football player
Zdeněk Hedrlín (1933–2018), Czech mathematician
Zdeněk Hnát (born 1935), Czech classical pianist
Zdeněk Hruška (born 1954), former Czechoslovak footballer and football manager
Zdeněk Humhal (born 1933), Czech former volleyball player
Zdeněk Chalabala (1899–1962), Czech conductor
Zdeněk Jarkovský (1918–1948), ice hockey player for the Czechoslovak national team
Zdeněk Jirotka (1911–2003), Czech writer of radio-broadcast plays and author of humorous novels, short stories, feuilletons
Zdeněk Kalista (1900–1982), Czech historian, poet, literary critic, and editor
Zdeněk Kopal (1914–1993), Czech astronomer who mainly worked in England
Zdeněk Košler (1928–1995), Czech conductor
Zdeněk Koukal (born 1984), Czech football player
Zdeněk Kovář (1917–2004), Czech industrial designer
Zdeněk Kroča (born 1980), Czech footballer
Zdeněk Kroupa (1921–1999), Czech operatic bass singer
Zdeněk Kubica (born 1986), Czech ice hockey player
Zdeněk Kudrna (1946–1982), international speedway rider
Zdeněk Kutlák (born 1980), Czech ice hockey player
Zdeněk Lenhart (born 1948), orienteering competitor who competed for Czechoslovakia
Zdeněk Liška (1922–1983), Czech composer who produced a large number of film scores
Zdeněk Lukáš (1928–2007), prolific Czech composer having composed over 330 works
Zdeněk Mácal (born 1936), Czech conductor
Zdeněk Matějka (1937–2006), Czech chemist known for his contributions to development of ion exchange
Zdeněk Matějček (born 1922), Czech children's psychologist and researcher
Zdeněk Měšťan (born 1944), Czechoslovak slalom canoeist
Zdeněk Miler (February 21, 1921), Czech animator and illustrator best known for his Mole character and its adventures
Zdeněk Mlynář (1930–1997), Czech intellectual
Zdeněk Moravec, Czech astronomer
Zdeněk Nedvěd (born 1975), professional ice hockey player
Zdeněk Nehoda (born 1952), Czech football forward
Zdeněk Nejedlý (born 1878), Czech musicologist, music critic, author, and politician
Zdeněk Neubauer (born 1942), Czech philosopher and biologist
Zdeněk Opočenský (1896–1975), Czech gymnast
Zdeněk Otava (1902–1980), Czech operatic baritone
Zdeněk Pazdírek (born 1953), former Czechoslovak figure skater
Zdeněk Pecka (born 1954), Czech rower
Zdeněk Podskalský (1923–1993), Czech film director and screenwriter
Zdeněk Pololáník (born 1935), Czech contemporary composer
Zdeněk Pospěch (born 1978), Czech footballer
Zdeněk Rohlíček (born 1980), Czech actor known especially for his stage work
Zdeněk Rygel (born 1951), former football player from Czechoslovakia
Zdeněk Sádecký (1925–1971), Czech musicologist
Zdeněk Simota (born 1985), currently rides in the Czech ExtraLeague with AK Plzeň
František Zdeněk Skuherský (1830–1892), Czech composer, pedagogue, and theoretician
Zdeněk Srstka (born 1935), Czech actor, stunt and weightlifter
Zdeněk Svoboda (born 1972), former professional footballer
Zdeněk Svěrák (born 1936), Czech actor, humorist and scriptwriter
Zdeněk Šafář (born 1978), Czech freestyle skier who specializes in skicross
Zdeněk Ščasný (born 1957), Czech football manager and former player
Zdeněk Šenkeřík (born 1980), Czech football striker
Zdeněk Škára (born 1950), Czechoslovak handball player
Zdeněk Škrland (1914–1996), Czechoslovak sprint canoeist
Zdeněk Šmejkal (born 1988), professional Czech football player
Zdeněk Špinar (1916–1995), Czech paleontologist and author
Zdeněk Štěpánek (1896–1968), Czech actor
Zdeněk Štybar (born 1985), Czech professional cyclo-cross cyclist
Zdeněk Tylšar (1945–2006), Czech player of the French horn
Zdeněk Tůma (born 1960), Czech economist, former Governor of the Czech National Bank
Zdeněk Valenta, Czechoslovak slalom canoeist
Zdeněk Vávra (born 1891), Olympic fencer, competed for Bohemia in 1912 and Czechoslovakia in 1920
Zdeněk Veselovský (1928–2006), important Czech zoologist
Zdeněk Vítek (born 1977), Czech biathlete
Zdeněk Zeman (born 1947), Czech-Italian football coach
Zdeněk Ziegler, Czechoslovak sprint canoeist
Zdeněk Zikán (born 1937), Czech former football player
Zdeněk Zlámal (born 1985), Czech football goalkeeper

See also
 
Mole (Zdeněk Miler character), animated character in cartoons by Czech animator Zdeněk Miler

References

Czech masculine given names